Scandal is an American rock band from the 1980s fronted by Patty Smyth. The band scored a hit in the United States with the song "The Warrior", which peaked at No. 7 in 1984. Other hits were "Goodbye to You" (1982 – No. 65 US), "Love's Got a Line on You" (1983 – No. 59 US), "Hands Tied" (1984 – No. 41 US), and "Beat of a Heart" (1985 – No. 41 US).

History
Scandal was formed in New York City in 1981 by guitarist Zack Smith. The other initial members included: bassist Ivan Elias (1950–1995), guitarist Keith Mack, keyboardist Benjy King (1953–2012), drummer Frankie LaRocka (1954–2005) (later replaced by Thommy Price), and singer Patty Smyth. Bon Jovi lead singer Jon Bon Jovi also briefly played guitar for the band in 1983.

The band had much success early on but due to struggles within the group and their record company, it slowly dissolved—losing member after member. By the time "The Warrior" tour hit the road in 1984, all that remained of the original lineup were Smyth and Mack. Scandal broke up shortly after the tour ended. The group (minus Ivan Elias, who died of cancer in June 1995; replaced by Kasim Sulton) reunited in 2004 for VH1's Bands Reunited show and did a string of concerts on the United States East Coast culminating in a show at Irving Plaza in their home city (New York) on February 9, 2005. During the summer of 2006, the band (excluding Price and Sulton) reunited again for VH1's "We Are the '80s" tour, playing a string of large – mainly outdoor – venues and earning critical acclaim. During the summer and fall of 2007, they toured again (this time without Zack Smith).

In July 2008, Billboard reported the upcoming release of new music by Patty Smyth and Scandal (featuring original members Keith Mack and Benjy King). At a performance in Dewey Beach, Delaware on August 3, 2008, Smyth indicated Scandal would be releasing a new five song EP in the near future. Scandal also performed one of their new songs, "Trust in Me". Other new titles include "Make It Hard" and "End of the Girl".  Patty Smyth & Scandal debuted their first single as a band ("Hard for You to Love Me", also referred to as "Make It Hard") in over 24 years on January 17, 2009 in Ridgefield, Connecticut to a standing ovation.  Smyth stated the song will be available to purchase digitally in February 2009, with the new EP to follow shortly.  However, the single has been indefinitely delayed as the EP will be expanded to a full-length album, according to Smyth's blog in May 2009.  As of December 2011, the only new music released was "Silent Night", their cover of the Christmas classic, which was featured in the NCIS Season 9 Christmas episode, "Newborn King" and subsequently available for purchase on the band's official website.

Original drummer Frankie LaRocka died in 2005 after undergoing surgery. Original keyboardist Benjy King died on September 20, 2012, from injuries sustained in an accident.

Band members
Current members
 Patty Smyth – lead vocals (1981–1985, 2004–present)
 Keith Mack – guitar (1981–1985, 2004–present)
 Tom Welsch – bass (2006–present)
 Eran Asias – drums (2006–present)

Former members
 Benjy King – keyboards, guitar (1981–1984, 2004–2012; died 2012)
 Zack Smith – guitar (1981–1984, 2004–2006)
 Ivan Elias – bass (1981–1984; died 1995)
 Frankie LaRocka – drums (1981–1982; died 2005)
 Thommy Price – drums (1982–1984, 2004–2006)
 Jon Bon Jovi – guitar (1983)
 Kasim Sulton – bass (2004–2006)

Discography

Albums

Compilations
 Scandalous (1992)
 We Are the '80s (2006)

Live albums
Goodbye to You! Best of the 80's Live (2018)

Singles

Music videos
Scandal has music videos for the following songs: 
 "Goodbye to You"
 "Love's Got a Line on You"
 "The Warrior"
 "Beat of a Heart"
 "Hands Tied"

See also
List of 1980s one-hit wonders in the United States

References

External links

American pop rock music groups
Rock music groups from New York (state)
Musical groups established in 1981
Musical groups disestablished in 1985
Musical groups reestablished in 2004
Musical groups from New York City
Female-fronted musical groups